Epsio is a suite developed by the Belgian company EVS Broadcast Equipment which allows virtual graphic overlay insertions in real-time or in instant replays. All these effects can instantly be added with the Multicam (LSM) remote controller and are immediately available. Operators can also insert virtual advertisements allowing the field advertisements to adapt to the audience.

Graphics
Editorial graphics can be an offside line, the  circle for the direct free kick, the distance to the goal or the scores and logos insertions.

FIFA
The software was introduced in 2010 for the FIFA World Cup  and it is now widely used in sport events, with different modules available.

External links 
 Epsio on EVS Official WebSite

References 

Broadcast engineering
Video